Methaemalbuminaemia is a clinical condition that can be caused by severe intravascular haemolysis or acute haemorrhagic pancreatitis. This can be due to proteolytic breakdown of haemoglobin to form both haem and methaem. Methaem combines with blood plasma albumin to form methemalbumin which is found in trace amount in the blood.
Bleeding into the abdominal cavity is another known cause of methaemalbuminaemia.
Methaemalbumin in blood is detected by carrying out a test known as Schumm test which is a spectroscopic identification on addition of ammonium sulphide.

See also
 Methemalbumin

References
 
 https://books.google.com/books?id=yrk5MHB3fMwC&pg=PT80&lpg=PT80

Blood disorders